The Bosnia and Herzegovina men's national sitting volleyball team (Bosnian: Reprezentacija BiH u sjedećoj odbojci) represents Bosnia and Herzegovina in international sitting volleyball competitions and friendly matches. Bosnia is one of the dominant forces in sitting volleyball worldwide, alongside Iran. The team won a bronze medal, during ECVD European Championships in 1997 in Tallinn. It took nearly two decades later for the nation to win a medal outside the sport of sitting volleyball when Amel Tuka won bronze during 2015 World Championships in Athletics.

The team is the most decorated in Bosnia and Herzegovina sport having won 2 paralympic volleyball gold medals, 3 paralympic silver medals, 3 World Cup titles, and 9 won European Championships straight. The team won World titles and European titles either side of winning Paralympics Gold in 2004 Athens. The team is a member of the world (WOVD) and European (ECVD) sitting volleyball governing bodies.

It is governed by the Association of sitting volleyball of Bosnia and Herzegovina (Savez sjedeće odbojke BiH). Until 1992, Bosnian players like Ševko Nuhanović were part of the Yugoslav national sitting volleyball team.

History

Prior to 1992, during the Yugoslavia days, the beginnings of the team started to take its form. Players were part of Sarajevo based Uporni Sitting Volleyball Club which were champions of Yugoslavia three times in a row. Bosnia and Herzegovina men's sitting volleyball team includes athletes who were deeply affected by the Bosnian War (6 April 1992 – 14 December 1995). Due to the large number of people injured in the conflict, the country started to invest more in Paralympic sports. Captain Sabahudin Delalić fought for the Bosnian army and lost part of his right leg after a wall fell on him. Safet Alibašić lost one of his legs when he stepped on a landmine.

The first major tournament participation came in during 1995 European championship. During its qualification phase in early December 1994, the team (all players from Sarajevo club SDI Spid), traveled to Zagreb on a bus riddled with bullet holes in temperatures of 17 degrees below zero. Bosnia along with Austria were the only nations to travel to play Croatia in the qualification tournament (out of 11 invited). Croatia finished undefeated with victories over Austria 3:0 (15:5, 15:8, 16:14) and Bosnia (15:6, 15:8, 15:11). Bosnia beat Austria, however all 3 nations qualified for the finals.

Team made their Paralympic Games debut at Sydney 2000 and won silver. There were five total Paralympic podium finishes in sitting volleyball for Bosnia and Herzegovina. They are the only medals in Olympic and Paralympic Games as an independent nation (from Yugoslavia). The 800 metres distance runner Amel Tuka holds the only other prestigious medal for Bosnia and Herzegovina, a bronze at 2015 World Championships in Athletics in Beijing.

On 21 June 2014, Edin Džeko congratulated the BiH men's national sitting volleyball team after they won 2014 Sitting Volleyball World Championships title, stating "You are our pride and inspiration".

On 10 September 2012, Basketball Federation of Bosnia and Herzegovina congratulated the BiH sitting volleyball team upon their paralympic gold medal win at 2012 Summer Paralympics in London, saying "You are a pride of our nation",
 as did NFSBiH (normalization committee) with Ivica Osim at the head.

Success formula

Height, experience and strong club league are key to success in the sitting volleyball. 80% of the Bosnian national team players come from Sarajevo based and Europe's top two sitting volleyball club sides; SDI Spid and OKI Fantomi. Height is a critical aspect of successful team as was case with Iranian national team winning gold over Bosnia at Rio 2016 Paralympics final due to height advantage of tallest Paralympian Morteza Mehrzadselakjani at 2.46m (8ft 1in), giving his team an advantage in his ability to both block at the net and fire over returns from a much higher trajectory. In the Rio final; Mehrzadselakjani was top scorer for Iran with 28 points. Safet Alibašić top scored for BIH with 16 points. Fastest serve came from Adnan Manko at 68 km/h. Sport investment, financial backing and sprint velocities are other key factors.

Style of play

Bosnia play an attacking style of volleyball.

Nickname

A popular nickname of all Bosnian sport players and/or teams is the Zmajevi or Dragons in English alluding to the famous Bosnian general Husein Gradaščević who fought for Bosnian independence and who was known as the "Dragon of Bosnia". In foreign media, they are sometimes referred to as the Golden Lilies, in reference to the golden lily featured on the coat of arms of the influential Bosnian medieval Kotromanić dynasty.

Sponsorship

Team is sponsored by Sarajevo based telecommunication company BH Telecom d.d. since 1996.

Honours

Seniors Competitive record

Paralympic Games

World Para Volleyball Championship

European Championships

 Bosnia played 1 extra opponent in group stage of 2017 championship while Russia/Ukraine/Croatia (other semi-final sides) played 1 less.

Minor tournaments
Note: WOVD Intercontinental Cup tournaments serve as Paralympic qualifiers. In 2005 Sarajevo competition; club Sdi Spid faced Iran in the final.

Juniors Competitive record

Junior World Championships

Junior European Championships

Coaches

Coaching staff

Players

Players called up for 2016 Summer Paralympics:

Head coach: Mirza Hrustemović

Players called up for 2015 European Championships:

Sabahudin Delalić (captain), Dževad Hamzić, Asim Medić, Safet Alibašić, Beniz Kadrić, Ermin Jusufović, Muhamed Kapetanović, Nizam Čančar, Ismet Godinjak, Adnan Manko, Mirzet Duran, Adnan Kešmer, Edin Džino, Armin Šehić, Jasmin Brkić, Adin Likić, Damir Grbić.

Players called up for 2012 Summer Paralympics:

Players called up for 2008 Summer Paralympics:

Safet Alibašić, Sabahudin Delalić (captain), Mirzet Duran, Esad Durmišević, Ismet Godinjak, Dževad Hamzić, Ermin Jusufović, Hidaet Jusufović (libero), Zikret Mahmić, Adnan Manko, Asim Medić, Ejub Mehmedović.

Players called up for 2004 Summer Paralympics:

Dževad Hamzić, Nedzad Salkić, Safet Alibašić, Sabahudin Delalić, Ermin Jusufović, Zikret Mahmić, Fikret Causević, Asim Medić, Esad Durmisević, Ejub Mehmedović, Adnan Manko, Ismet Godinjak.

Players called up for 2000 Summer Paralympics:

Dževad Hamzić, Nedžad Salkić, Abid Čišija, Sabahudin Delalić, Nevzet Alić, Zikret Mahmić, Fikret Čausević, Asim Medić, Edin Ibraković, Ševko Nuhanović, Adnan Manko, Ismet Godinjak.

The players in the B&H national side predominantly are selected from two biggest clubs from Bosnia and Herzegovina:KSO Spid Sarajevo and OKI Fantomi Sarajevo (Volleyball Club Invalids Phantoms). The sitting volleyball clubs started by gathering mostly war veterans handicapped during Bosnian War. Both clubs are multiple league champions at home.

KSO Spid
KSO Spid was founded on 5 April 1994.

 Bosnia and Herzegovina Sitting Volleyball Championship:
Winners (16): 1994, 1995, 1997, 1998, 1999, 2000, 2001, 2003, 2004, 2005, 2007, 2010, 2011, 2012, 2013, 2014, 2015, 2016, 2017, 2018, 2019, 2020.
Runners-Up (4): 2002, 2006, 2008, 2009.
 Bosnia and Herzegovina Sitting Volleyball National Cup:
Winners (2): 1999, 2000.
 Sitting Volleyball Champions League:
Winners (7): 2000, 2001, 2002, 2003, 2005, 2006, 2010
Runners-Up (4): 1998, 1999, 2004, 2007.
3rd Place (1): 2008.
 Sitting Volleyball World Club Championship:
Runners-Up (2): 2003, 2005.
 Sitting Volleyball Sarajevo Open:
Winners (1): 2004.

OKI Fantomi
OKI "Phantom" were established in 1995 in Sarajevo.

 Bosnia and Herzegovina Sitting Volleyball Championship:
Winners (5): 1996, 2002, 2006, 2008, 2009
Runners-Up (8): 1997, 1999, 2000, 2001, 2003, 2005, 2007, 2012.
 Bosnia and Herzegovina Sitting Volleyball National Cup:
Winners (1): 2009
 Sitting Volleyball Champions League:
Winners (3): 2004, 2007, 2008.
Runners-Up (4): 2003, 2005, 2006, 2011.
3rd Place (1): 2001.
 Sitting Volleyball Sarajevo Open:
Winners (12): 2002, 2003, 2006, 2007, 2008, 2009, 2010, 2011, 2012, 2014, 2015, 2016.
Runners-Up (3): 2004, 2005, 2013.

Sarajevo Open

Organised annually by OKI Fantomi volleyball club, Sarajevo Open has grown into a tournament of prestige for national teams and elite club sides and is a highly rated calendar event by participants.

International trust fund for demining and mine victims assistance (ITF) is a sponsor of OKI "FANTOMI" Sarajevo and Sarajevo Open.

Results

1994–1999

2000–2009

2010–present

Legend

Statistics

Most appearances – All time list
Sorted by date of birth as it is difficult to know exact number of appearances. Most appearances during career playing for Bosnia and Herz. Former Yugoslavia statistics where applicable not included.

Multiple gold medalists at Paralympics

This is a list of multiple Paralympics gold medalists for Bosnia in sitting volleyball, listing people who have won two or more gold medals (sorted by gold medal first).

Biggest wins by Bosnia
Table sorted by points conceded (scored against BiH) in straight sets win (least to most).

Biggest defeats by Bosnia

World ranking
As at 28 September 2016.
 Bosnia best European rank in sitting volleyball was 1st.

At 2016 Rio Paralympics, Bosnia retained Rank at No. 1 (seed No. 1) as defending Paralympic champion.

Top rivals
Rivals Bosnia predominantly meets in the finals of major competitions listed.

Bosnia–Iran rivalry
Bosnians brought an end to the Iranians' series of four Paralympic golds at Athens 2004, the two teams have met in all the finals of the Paralympic Games and world championships, except in 2014, when the Bosnians faced Brazil.

Sitting volleyball is not the only men's sport these two nations faced each other at the biggest stage of a competition. Bosnia played and beat Iran at both 2014 Soccer World Cup and 2015 Handball World Championship.

Bosnia–Germany rivalry
Bosnia since team formation has been an adversary to Germany during European sitting volleyball championships as teams have met at almost every major tournament in later stages of the finals.

Bosnia–Russia rivalry
Bosnia since team formation has been an adversary to Russia during European sitting volleyball championships as teams have met several times at major tournament finals.

Sport in popular culture
 West Ham United and Croatian former soccer manager Slaven Bilić played sitting volleyball during International Paralympic Day in Split on 8 September 2011.
 Sergej Barbarez met the OKI Fantomi club during the friendly sitting volleyball tournament 2006 Siemens Cup in Hamburg. Fantomi beat Germany in the final 2–0.

See also

 Bosnia and Herzegovina at the Paralympics
 Volleyball at the Summer Paralympics
 World Organization Volleyball for Disabled

References

Bibliography

External links

SSOBiH.org – Official website

Volleyball in Bosnia and Herzegovina
National sitting volleyball teams
volleyball